Lovely Creatures: The Best of Nick Cave and the Bad Seeds is a compilation album by Australian rock band Nick Cave and the Bad Seeds, released on 5 May 2017.

Track listing

Two-disc edition

Deluxe edition

Charts

Weekly charts

Year-end charts

Certifications

References

2017 greatest hits albums
Nick Cave compilation albums
Mute Records compilation albums